The Ensign magazine is the official publication of the United States Power Squadrons (or USPS). All active members and apprentice/Sea Scout members of USPS receive a subscription unless they opt out. Published at USPS headquarters in Raleigh, North Carolina, The Ensign covers topics of interest to USPS members and other boating enthusiasts.

The Ensign was launched in 1914 and is published quarterly. Most articles are written by USPS members, and all are edited by a professional staff. Each issue contains two to four feature articles related to boating or USPS. Regular columns and departments in The Ensign are

Bridge–a message from a member of the USPS national Bridge
Soundings–letters to the editor
Provisions–new-product briefs
Stargazer–stargazing article and calendar
Currents–USPS calendar and news
Scorecard–boating product review
Shipshape–in-depth technical articles, how-to tips and safety information
Ship's Library–book reviews
Waypoints–local squadron news and activities
Last Horizon–listing of recently deceased USPS members
Bitter End–photos, contests, puzzles, nautical quotes and trivia, and stories behind members' boat names

Author Marlin Bree has twice won the West Marine Writer's Award, the top writing award from Boating Writers International, for feature articles published in The Ensign. He won the 2004 award for "A Solo Sailor Meets His Storm of the Century: The Day All Hell Broke Loose," which appeared in the June 2003 issue. Bree also won the 2008 award for "The Old Man and the Inland Sea," which was published in the January–February 2007 issue.

References

External links
 The Ensign website
 Electronic version of the May/June 2009 issue
 United States Power Squadrons website

1914 establishments in North Carolina
Quarterly magazines published in the United States
Boating magazines
Magazines established in 1914
Magazines published in North Carolina
Maritime magazines
Mass media in Raleigh, North Carolina
Professional and trade magazines